Nedjem was an ancient Egyptian prince of the Eighteenth dynasty. He was a son of Pharaoh Amenhotep II.

He is known from only one source: he is mentioned, along with his brother Webensenu, on a statue of Minmose, overseer of the workmen in Karnak.

Sources

Princes of the Eighteenth Dynasty of Egypt
Children of Amenhotep II